Evangelismos is a village and a community of the Elassona municipality. Before the 2011 local government reform it was part of the municipality of Elassona, of which it was a municipal district. The 2011 census recorded 722 inhabitants in the village. The community of Evangelismos covers an area of 23.634 km2.

Population
According to the 2011 census, the population of Evangelismos was 722 people, a decrease of almost 13% compared to that of the previous census of 2001.

See also
 List of settlements in the Larissa regional unit

References

Populated places in Larissa (regional unit)